Hastula maryleeae is a species of sea snail, a marine gastropod mollusc in the family Terebridae, the auger snails.

Description
The length of the shell varies between 14 mm and 30 mm.

Distribution
This marine species occurs off in the Gulf of Mexico off Texas, USA; in the Caribbean Sea off Belize; Trinidad & Tobago.

References

 Burch, R. D., 1965. New Terebrid Species from the Indo-Pacific Ocean and from the Gulf of Mexico, with New Locality Records and Provisional Lists of Soecies Collected in Western Australia and Sabah, Malaysia. The Veliger 7(4): 241–253
 Terryn Y. (2020). A review of Western Atlantic Hastula (Conoidea: Terebridae), with the description of a new species from Mexico. Gloria Maris. 59(3): 102–107. page(s): 103, pl. 2 figs 6–9

External links
 Rosenberg, G.; Moretzsohn, F.; García, E. F. (2009). Gastropoda (Mollusca) of the Gulf of Mexico, Pp. 579–699 in: Felder, D.L. and D.K. Camp (eds.), Gulf of Mexico–Origins, Waters, and Biota. Texas A&M Press, College Station, Texas
 Fedosov, A. E.; Malcolm, G.; Terryn, Y.; Gorson, J.; Modica, M. V.; Holford, M.; Puillandre, N. (2020). Phylogenetic classification of the family Terebridae (Neogastropoda: Conoidea). Journal of Molluscan Studies. 85(4): 359-388

Terebridae
Gastropods described in 1965